The IWRG Intercontinental Women's Championship (Campeonato Intercontinental Feminil IWRG in Spanish) is an inactive women's professional wrestling championship promoted by the Mexican wrestling promotion International Wrestling Revolution Group (IWRG). As it was a professional wrestling championship, the championship was not won not by actual competition, but by a scripted ending to a match determined by the bookers and match makers. On occasion the promotion declares a championship vacant, which means there is no champion at that point in time. This can either be due to a storyline, or real life issues such as a champion suffering an injury being unable to defend the championship, or leaving the company.

The first champion was Ayako Hamada who won it on September 11, 2003 in an elimination match against Flor Metalica, La Amapola, Lady Metal, Joseline, Marcela, Migala and La Diabólica. After the win Hamada began working in Japan more and more, thus never defending the title in Mexico. In 2005 La Amapola showed up at a wrestling event wearing the Women's title, claiming to have won it in Japan, without any sources to support the claim. The title has not been defended or promoted since 2007 where when IWRG stopped working with Consejo Mundial de Lucha Libre (CMLL), La Amapola's employee. Amapola has not officially been stripped of the title; it is inactive as the IWRG does not promote it or refer to it any more.

Title history

Footnotes

References

External links
wrestling-titles.com
Solie.org

International Wrestling Revolution Group championships
Women's professional wrestling championships
Intercontinental professional wrestling championships
2003 establishments in Mexico